Christmas Is Here! is the seventh studio album by American a cappella group Pentatonix. It is also their third full-length holiday album following A Pentatonix Christmas in 2016.

It was released on RCA Records, and the first single is a cover of "Making Christmas" from The Nightmare Before Christmas. Pentatonix has promoted the album through a tour of the same name, which started in November 2018 at The Theatre at Grand Prairie.

Reception
Chuck Campbell of the Knoxville News Sentinel rated the album four out of five stars.

Track listing
Unless otherwise noted, Information is taken from the album's Liner Notes 

Track listing adapted from Billboard and iTunes.

Personnel 
Unless otherwise noted, Information is taken from the album's Liner Notes
Pentatonix
 Scott Hoying – producer, baritone lead, backing vocals and co-vocal bass in "Here Comes Santa Claus"
 Mitch Grassi – producer, tenor lead and backing vocals
 Kirstin Maldonado – producer, alto lead and backing vocals
 Matt Sallee – producer, vocal bass, bass lead and backing vocals
 Kevin Olusola – producer, vocal percussion, backing vocals, vocal flugelhorn on "Rockin' Around the Christmas Tree"

Others
 Ed Boyer - audio mixing 
 Ben Bram - producer, recording engineer
 RaVaughn Brown - choir vocals (1, 7)
 Busbee - Maren Morris' vocal producer on "When You Believe"
 Kelly Clarkson - guest vocals on "My Grown-Up Christmas List"
 Deonis Cook - choir vocals (1, 7)
 Jack Gold - musical arrangement on "Jingle Bells"
 Jason Halbert - vocal producer on "My Grown-Up Christmas List"
 Kerri Lawson - choir vocals (1, 7)
 Maren Morris - guest vocals on "When You Believe"
 Sean O'Loughlin - conductor, orchestration on "Jingle Bells"
 Orchestra Members - various instruments on "Jingle Bells"
 Marty Paich - musical arrangement on "Jingle Bells"
 Tiffany Palmer - choir vocals (1, 7)
 Chelsea West - choir vocals (1, 7)
 Brandon Winbush - choir vocals (1, 7)

Charts

Weekly charts

Year-end charts

See also 
 List of Billboard Top Holiday Albums number ones of the 2010s

References

2018 Christmas albums
Christmas albums by American artists
Pentatonix albums
RCA Records Christmas albums